Werner Heisenberg contributed to science at a point when the old quantum physics was discovering a field littered with more and more stumbling blocks. He decided that quantum physics had to be re-thought from the ground up. In doing so he excised several items that were grounded in classical physics and its modeling of the macro world. Heisenberg determined to base his quantum mechanics "exclusively upon relationships between quantities that in principle are observable." By so doing he constructed an entryway to matrix mechanics.

He observed that one could not then use any statements about such things as "the position and period of revolution of the electron." Rather, to make true progress in understanding the radiation of the simplest case, the radiation of excited hydrogen atoms, one had measurements only of the frequencies and the intensities of the hydrogen bright-line spectrum to work with.

In classical physics, the intensity of each frequency of light produced in a radiating system is equal to the square of the amplitude of the radiation at that frequency, so attention next fell on amplitudes. The classical equations that Heisenberg hoped to use to form quantum theoretical equations would first yield the amplitudes, and in classical physics one could compute the intensities simply by squaring the amplitudes. But Heisenberg saw that "the simplest and most natural assumption would be" to follow the lead provided by recent work in computing light dispersion done by Kramers. The work he had done assisting Kramers in the previous year<ref>See paper 3 in B.L.Van der Waerden, Sources of Quantum Mechanics'.</ref> now gave him an important clue about how to model what happened to excited hydrogen gas when it radiated light and what happened when incoming radiation of one frequency excited atoms in a dispersive medium and then the energy delivered by the incoming light was re-radiated sometimes at the original frequency but often at two lower frequencies the sum of which equalled the original frequency. According to their model, an electron that had been driven to a higher energy state by accepting the energy of an incoming photon might return in one step to its equilibrium position, re-radiating a photon of the same frequency, or it might return in more than one step, radiating one photon for each step in its return to its equilibrium state.  Because of the way factors cancel out in deriving the new equation based on these considerations, the result turns out to be relatively simple.

Development of full quantum mechanical theory
Werner Heisenberg used the idea that since classical physics is correct when it applies to phenomena in the world of things larger than atoms and molecules, it must stand as a special case of a more inclusive quantum theoretical model. So he hoped that he could modify quantum physics in such a way that when the parameters were on the scale of everyday objects it would look just like classical physics, but when the parameters were pulled down to the atomic scale the discontinuities seen in things like the widely spaced frequencies of the visible hydrogen bright line spectrum would come back into sight.

The one thing that people at that time most wanted to understand about hydrogen radiation was how to predict or account for the intensities of the lines in its spectrum. Although Heisenberg did not know it at the time, the general format he worked out to express his new way of working with quantum theoretical calculations can serve as a recipe for two matrices and how to multiply them.

Heisenberg's groundbreaking paper of 1925 neither uses nor even mentions matrices. Heisenberg's great advance was the "scheme which was capable in principle of determining uniquely the relevant physical qualities (transition frequencies and amplitudes)" of hydrogen radiation.

After Heisenberg wrote his ground breaking paper, he turned it over to one of his senior colleagues for any needed corrections and went on vacation. Max Born puzzled over the equations and the non-commuting equations that Heisenberg had found troublesome and disturbing. After several days he realized that these equations amounted to directions for writing out matrices. Matrices were a bit off the beaten track, even for mathematicians of that time, but how to do math with them was already clearly established. He and a few colleagues took up the task of working everything out in matrix form before Heisenberg returned from his time off, and within a few months the new quantum mechanics in matrix form formed the basis for another paper.

When quantities such as position and momentum are mentioned in the context of Heisenberg's matrix mechanics, it is essential to keep in mind that a statement such as pq ≠ qp does not refer to a single value of p and a single value q but to a matrix (grid of values arranged in a defined way) of values of position and a matrix of values of momentum. So multiplying p times q or q times p is really talking about the matrix multiplication of the two matrices. When two matrices are multiplied, the answer is a third matrix.

Max Born saw that when the matrices that represent pq and qp were calculated they would not be equal. Heisenberg had already seen the same thing in terms of his original way of formulating things, and Heisenberg may have guessed what was almost immediately obvious to Born that the difference between the answer matrices for pq and for qp would always involve two factors that came out of Heisenberg's original math: Planck's constant h and i, which is the square root of negative one.  So the very idea of what Heisenberg preferred to call the "indeterminacy principle" (usually known as the uncertainty principle) was lurking in Heisenberg's original equations.

Paul Dirac decided that the essence of Heisenberg's work lay in the very feature that Heisenberg had originally found problematical the fact of non-commutativity such as that between multiplication of a momentum matrix by a displacement matrix and multiplication of a displacement matrix by a momentum matrix. That insight led Dirac in new and productive directions.

Uncertainty principle

One of Heisenberg's seniors, Max Born explained how he took his strange "recipe" given above and discovered something ground breaking:
By consideration of ...examples...[Heisenberg] found this rule.... This was in the summer of 1925. Heisenberg...took leave of absence...and handed over his paper to me for publication....Heisenberg's rule of multiplication left me no peace, and after a week of intensive thought and trial, I suddenly remembered an algebraic theory....Such quadratic arrays are quite familiar to mathematicians and are called matrices, in association with a definite rule of multiplication. I applied this rule to Heisenberg's quantum condition and found that it agreed for the diagonal elements. It was easy to guess what the remaining elements must be, namely, null; and immediately there stood before me the strange formula 

This formula is the core of the Heisenberg uncertainty principle, derived from the mathematics. Quantum mechanics strongly limits the precision with which the properties of moving subatomic particles can be measured. An observer can precisely measure either position (displacement) or momentum, but not both. In the limit, measuring either variable with complete precision would entail a complete absence of precision in the measurement of the other.

The breakthrough equation

By means of an intense series of mathematical analogies that some physicists have termed "magical," Werner Heisenberg wrote out an equation that is the quantum mechanical analog for the classical computation of intensities. 
The equation below appears in his paper of 1925.In the paper by Aitchison, et al., it is equation (10) on page 5. Its general form is as follows:

This general format indicates that some term  is to be computed by summing up all of the products of some group of terms  by some related group of terms . There will potentially be an infinite series of  terms and their matching  terms. Each of these multiplications has as its factors two measurements that pertain to sequential downward transitions between energy states of an electron. This type of rule differentiates matrix mechanics from the kind of physics familiar in everyday life because the important values are where (in what energy state or "orbital") the electron begins and in what energy state it ends, not what the electron is doing while in one or another state.

The formula looks rather intimidating, but if  and  both refer to lists of frequencies, for instance, all it says to do is perform the following multiplications 
and then sum them up:

Multiply the frequency for a change of energy from state  to state  by the frequency for a change of energy from state n-a to state n-b. and to that add the product found by multiplying the frequency for a change of energy from state n-a to state n-b by the frequency for a change of energy from state n-b to state n-c, and so forth.  Symbolically, that is: 
 

etc.

It would be easy to perform each individual step of this process for some measured quantity. For instance, the boxed formula at the head of this article gives each needed wavelength in sequence. The values calculated could very easily be filled into a grid as described below. However, since the series is infinite, nobody could do the entire set of calculations.

Heisenberg originally devised this equation to enable himself to multiply two measurements of the same kind (amplitudes), so it happened not to matter in which order they were multiplied. Heisenberg noticed, however that if he tried to use the same schema to multiply two variables, such as momentum, p, and displacement, q, then "a significant difficulty arises." It turns out that multiplying a matrix of p by a matrix of q gives a different result from multiplying a matrix of q by a matrix of p. It only made a tiny bit of difference, but that difference could never be reduced below a certain limit, and that limit involved Planck's constant, h. More on that later. Below is a very short sample of what the calculations would be, placed into grids that are called matrices. Heisenberg's teacher saw almost immediately that his work should be expressed in a matrix format because mathematicians already were familiar with how to do computations involving matrices in an efficient way. (Since Heisenberg was interested in photon radiation, the illustrations will be given in terms of electrons going from a higher energy level to a lower level, e.g., n ← n-1, instead of going from a lower level to a higher level, e.g., n→n-1)
 (equation for the conjugate variables momentum and position)

Matrix of p

Matrix of q

The matrix for the product of the above two matrices as specified by the relevant equation in Heisenberg's 1925 paper is

Where

and so forth.

If the matrices were reversed, the following values would result

and so forth.

Note how changing the order of multiplication changes the numbers, step by step, that are actually multiplied.

References
 Direct download for Aitchison et al. on this subject.
P.A.M. Dirac (1925), "The fundamental equations of quantum mechanics. Proceedings of the Royal Society of London. Series A, Containing Papers of a Mathematical and Physical Character", 109 (752), 642–653 online. The crucial reinterpretation synthesis of Heisenberg's paper, which introduces the contemporary language employed now.
B.L.Van der Waerden, Sources of Quantum Mechanics'', Dover Publications (2007), 

Foundational quantum physics